The Ministry of Finance (Abrv: MOF;) is a cabinet ministry in the Government of Thailand.

Considered to be one of the country's most important ministries, the Ministry of Finance has many responsibilities over public finance, taxation, the treasury, government properties, operations of government monopolies, and revenue-generating enterprises. The ministry is also vested with the power to provide loan guarantees for the governmental agencies, financial institutions, and state enterprises.

Management and budget
The head of the ministry is the Minister of Finance. He is a member of the Cabinet of Thailand and therefore appointed by the King of Thailand on the advice of the prime minister. , the Minister of Finance is Mr Apisak Tantivorawong. The MOF permanent secretary is Prasong Poontaneat.

The MOF was allocated 242,948 million baht in the FY2019 budget.

History 
The ministry has existed in form since the 15th century during the Ayutthaya Kingdom. Then, the ministry was called the "Kromma Khlang" ( and eventually upgraded to “Krom Phra Khlang” (sometimes written as "Berguelang" or "Barcelon" by foreign authors). The "Phra Khlang" or minister had wide-ranging powers include those of taxation, trade, monopolies, tributes, and even foreign affairs.

Most of these features were retained during the Rattanakosin era. In 1855 King Mongkut signed the Bowring Treaty with the United Kingdom. The treaty exposed Siam to modern trade and international commerce; the king was forced to set customs duty rate at no more than three percent; the country was at a disadvantage, but international trade grew. Soon the king was forced to set up a Customs House ( and the Royal Thai Mint to deal with new challenges.

During the reign of King Chulalongkorn (Rama V), the ministry took its present shape. The king issued a royal decree in 1875 consolidating all powers and agencies under one ministry with a more focused portfolio. He appointed one of his uncles, Prince Maha Mala Pamrabporapat as its first minister. The ministry finally came into its own in 1933 via the Civil Service Reform Act of 1933. The Royal Treasury Ministry was then changed to the Ministry of Finance which now consists of 10 departments and 14 state enterprises.

The MOF played a key role in the COVID-19 pandemic in Thailand as it was responsible for disbursing aid to needy citizens.

List of ministers
This is a list of Ministers of Finance of Thailand:

1873-1886: Prince Mahamala
1886-1892: Prince Chaturonrasmi
1892-1894: Prince Narisara Nuwattiwong
1894-1896: Prince Srisiddhi Thongjaya
1896-1906: Prince Jayanta Mongkol
1906-1907: Praya  (Koed Bunnag)
1907: Prince Kitiyakara Voralaksana
1908-1922: Prince Kitiyakara Voralaksana
1922-1929: Prince Suphayok Kasem
1929-1932: Praya Komankunramontri (Chern Komankun of Nakorn)
1932: Prince Suphayok Kasem
1932-1933: Praya Manopakorn Nititada
1933-1934: Choapraya Srithammathibet (Jit Srithammathibet of Songkra)
1934-1935: Praya Manavarahchasevi (Prot Vichien of Songkra)
1935-1936: Praya Phahonphonphayuhasena
1936-1938: Praya Chaiyotsombat (Serm Kritsanamara)
1938-1941: Pridi Banomyong 
1941-1944: Pao Pienlert Boripanyutakit
1944-1945: Khuang Aphaiwong
1945: Leng Srisomwong
1945-1946: Direk Jayanama
1946: Praya Srivisaravaja (Tienlieng Huntakun)
1946: Pridi Banomyong 
1946-1947: Vijitr Luritanon
1947-1948: Prince Vivadhanajaya
1948: Praya Tonavanikmontri (Visut Tonavanik)
1948-1949: Prince Vivadhanajaya
1949-1950: Plaek Phibunsongkhram
1950-1951: Pramanupanavimonsart (Chom Jamornman)
1951: Luang Wichitwathakan
1951-1953: Pao Pienlert Boripanyutakit
1953: Varakarnbanch (Boonkert Sutantanon)
1953: Pote Sarasin
1955: Chort Kunakasem
1957-1958: Serm Vinicchayakul
1959-1965: Sunthorn Hongladarom
1965-1973: Serm Vinicchayakul
1973-1974: Boonma Wongsawan
1974-1975: Sommai Huntakul
1975: Savetr Piempongsan
1975-1976: Boonchu Rojanasathien
1976: Savetr Piempongsan
1976-1979: Supat Suthatham
1979-1980: Kriangsak Chamanan
1980: Sommai Huntakul
1980-1981: Amnuay Veeravan
1981-1986: Sommai Huntakul
1986-1988: Suthee Singhasaneh
1988-1990: Pramuan Saphawasu
1990: Veerapong Ramangkul
1990-1991: Banharn Silpa-Archa
1991-1992: Suthee Singhasaneh
1992: Panat Simasathien
1992-1995: Tarrin Nimmanahaeminda
1995-1996: Surakiart Sathirathai
1996: Bodee Junnanon
1996: Chaiwat Wiboonsawat
1996-1997: Amnuay Veeravan
1997: Kosit Panpiemras
1997: Thanong Bidaya
1997-2001: Tarrin Nimmanahaeminda
2001-2003: Somkid Jatusripitak
2003-2004: Suchart Chaovisith
2003-2005: Somkid Jatusripitak
2005-2006: Thanong Bidaya
2006-2007: Pridiyathorn Devakula
2007-2008: Chalongphob Sussangkarn
2008: Surapong Suebwonglee
2008: Suchart Thada-Thamrongvech
2008-2011: Korn Chatikavanij
2011-2012: Thirachai Phuvanatnaranubala
2012-2014: Kittiratt Na-Ranong
2014-2015: Sommai Phasee
2015-2019: Apisak Tantivorawong
2019-2020: Uttama Savanayana
2020: Predee Daochai
2020 - present: Arkhom Termpittayapaisith

Departments

Government agencies 
Office of the Secretary to the Minister
Office of the Permanent Secretary
The Revenue Department: During the reign of King Rama V, the Revenue Department was organised as two separate departments: the External Revenue Department and the Internal Revenue Department. The External Revenue Department was responsible for the collection of taxes and duties outside Bangkok and was under the Royal Treasury Ministry, today's Ministry of Finance. Due to personnel shortages, district and sub-district chief officers were assigned to collect taxes and duties, and the department was subsequently brought under the Ministry of Interior. The Internal Revenue Department was responsible for the collection of taxes and duties within greater Bangkok (including areas in Pathum Thani, Nonthaburi, and Samut Prakan and was under the Ministry of Metropolis. This department was established following the advice of Mr W. A. Graham who was the Ministry of Metropolis's comptroller at the time. The two departments were finally combined and named the Revenue Department. It was established on 2 September 1915. The Revenue Department collects, administers, and develops six types of taxes: personal income tax; corporate income tax; value added tax; specific business tax; stamp duties; and petroleum income tax. These taxes combined account for more than 80 percent of total government revenue. The department operates 12 regional revenue offices, 119 area revenue offices, and 850 area revenue branch offices throughout the country as well as 14 bureaus at its headquarters.
 The Fiscal Policy Office
 The Treasury Department
 The Comptroller General Department
 The Customs Department
 The Excise Department
 The Public Debt Management Office
 The State Enterprise Policy Office (SEPO)

State enterprises  

The Government Lottery Office
Tobacco Authority of Thailand
 Government Savings Bank 
 GH Bank 
 Krung Thai Bank Public Company Limited 
 Bank for Agriculture and Agricultural Co-operatives
 Liquor Distillery Organization (Excise Department) 
 Playing Cards Factory (Excise Department) 
 Export-Import Bank of Thailand 
 Small Business Credit Guarantee Corporation (SBCG)
 Secondary Mortgage Corporation
 Small and Medium Enterprise Development Bank of Thailand (SME Bank)
 Student Loan Fund
 Dhanarak Asset Development Company Limited

Public organizations
Neighbouring Countries Economic Development Cooperation Agency (NEDA)

See also 
 Economy of Thailand
 Thai baht
 Thai lottery
 Bank of Thailand
 Stock Exchange of Thailand
 Cabinet of Thailand
 List of government ministries of Thailand
 Government of Thailand

External links
 Official Webpage

References 

 
Finance
Thailand
Finance in Thailand
1873 establishments in Siam